The Americas Zone was one of the three zones of the regional Davis Cup competition in 1997.

In the Americas Zone there were four different tiers, called groups, in which teams competed against each other to advance to the upper tier. Winners in Group I advanced to the World Group Qualifying Round, along with losing teams from the World Group first round. Teams who lost their respective ties competed in the relegation play-offs, with winning teams remaining in Group I, whereas teams who lost their play-offs were relegated to the Americas Zone Group II in 1998.

Participating nations

Draw

 relegated to Group II in 1998.
 and  advance to World Group Qualifying Round.

First round

Canada vs. Bahamas

Chile vs. Ecuador

Second round

Canada vs. Venezuela

Chile vs. Argentina

First round relegation play-offs

Bahamas vs. Venezuela

Argentina vs. Ecuador

Second round relegation play-offs

Argentina vs. Venezuela

References

External links
Davis Cup official website

Davis Cup Americas Zone
Americas Zone Group I